The Al Yaqoub Tower is a  tall skyscraper on Sheikh Zayed Road in Dubai, United Arab Emirates. The tower topped out in 2010 and was completed in 2013. It has 69 floors. The building is owned privately by Daro Saifuddin Yaquob, and functions as a 224-room hotel.

The building design was inspired by Elizabeth Tower (more commonly known as Big Ben) in London. However, no clock face is present on Al Yaqoub Tower. It also bears a resemblance to The Tower, a building located directly north of it.

Construction gallery

See also 
 List of tallest buildings in Dubai
List of tallest buildings in the United Arab Emirates

References

External links 

 Al Yaqoub Group 
 CTBUH

Hotel buildings completed in 2011
2011 establishments in the United Arab Emirates
Skyscraper hotels in Dubai